Primorje may refer to:

 Croatian Littoral (Hrvatsko primorje), a Croatian region
 Montenegrin Littoral (Crnogorsko primorje), a Montenegrin region
 Primorje EB, a Croatian water polo club from the western region
 NK Primorje, a Slovenian football club
 Dubrovačko Primorje, a Croatian municipality
 Primorje or Pomorje, a medieval South Slavic name for littoral regions
 Primorje (company), construction company from Slovenia
 Primorje, colloquial for Littoral Banovina (Primorska banovina) from 1929 to 1939
 Primorje, an informal name for Primorsky Krai, a federal subject of Russia in the Far East region of the country

See also
 Primorye
 Primorye, Kaliningrad Oblast
 Slovene Littoral (Primorska)